"Kimi wa Soleil" is the eighth single released by Japanese singer and cellist Kanon Wakeshima. The song was used as an ending theme for the anime Strike the Blood. The song peaked at number 64 on the Oricon Singles Chart and stayed on the chart for two weeks.

Track listing

Personnel
 Kanon Wakeshima – Vocals, Cello, Piano, Lyrics

References 

2015 singles
2015 songs
Kanon Wakeshima songs
Warner Music Japan singles
Anime songs
Song articles with missing songwriters